The Buffalo Bulls men's basketball team represents the University at Buffalo in Buffalo, New York, United States. The team currently competes in the National Collegiate Athletic Association (NCAA) at the Division I level as a member of the Mid-American Conference (MAC) East Division. Buffalo began play in 1915 and joined the MAC in 1998. They won their first MAC East Division title in 2009, and won a third MAC East Division title in 2015 along with their first outright MAC Regular-Season championship and first MAC Tournament title to earn the program's first bid to the NCAA Division I men's basketball tournament. The Bulls also have six appearances in the NCAA Men's Division II Basketball Championship between 1957 and 1965 and two appearances in the National Invitation Tournament (NIT). Their Head Coach position is currently vacant following Jim Whitesell’s departure in March 2023. Coach Whitesell was hired in April of 2019 to replace Nate Oats. Home games are played at the 6,783-seat Alumni Arena, which opened in 1982.

Recently, the Bulls have had a significant presence in The Basketball Tournament (TBT), a summer event with a $1 million winner-take-all purse. Blue Collar U, a team consisting mainly of UB alumni, first entered TBT in 2021, reaching the semifinals. The next year, Blue Collar U returned and won the tournament, with C. J. Massinburg being named tournament MVP.

Conference affiliations
1915–16 to 1942–43 – Independent
1943–44 to 1944–45 – 
1945–46 to 1977–78 – Independent
1978–79 to 1987–88 – State University of New York Athletic Conference (SUNYAC)
1988–89 to 1990–91 – Mid American Conference
1991–92 to 1993–94 – East Coast Conference
1994–95 to 1997–98 – Mid-Continent Conference (Mid-Con)
1998–99 to present – Mid-American Conference

Postseason

NCAA Division I tournament

The Bulls have appeared in the NCAA Division I tournament four times. Their combined record is 2–4.

NCAA Division II Tournament results
The Bulls have appeared in the NCAA Division II tournament six times. Their combined record is 5–8.

NIT results
The Bulls have appeared in the National Invitation Tournament (NIT) two times. Their record is 1–2.

Alumni Arena

The Buffalo Bulls play their home games at Alumni Arena, located in Amherst, New York. The arena seats 6,100 spectators and features a state of the art video-board, sound, and lighting systems.

Notable former players
Notable alumni include:
Turner Battle: MAC Player of the Year (2005), former Bulls assistant coach
Yassin Idbihi: basketball player for Bayern Munich
Javon McCrea: basketball player for Medi Bayreuth of the Bundesliga
Sam Pellom: Played for the Atlanta Hawks (1979–82) & Milwaukee Bucks (1982–83)
Mitchell Watt, basketball player for Ironi Nes Ziona of the Israeli Basketball Super League
Rasaun Young: Former all time leading scorer and coach at New Rochelle High School
Wes Clark
Jarryn Skeete
Justin Moss
Shannon Evans
Blake Hamilton
Mitchell Watt
Jeremy Harris
Nick Perkins
C.J. Massinburg

Retired numbers

Honored jerseys 
Jerseys were retired but the numbers remain available:

All-Americans
The following Buffalo players were named NCAA Men's Basketball All-Americans:

Turner Battle – 2005 (AP Honorable Mention)
Mitchell Watt – 2012 (AP Honorable Mention)
Javon McCrea – 2014 (AP Honorable Mention)
Justin Moss – 2015 (AP Honorable Mention)
C. J. Massinburg – 2019 (AP Honorable Mention)

Academic All-Americans
The following Buffalo players were named Academic All-Americans:

Turner Battle – 2005

Mid-American Conference award recipients

Player of the Year
Turner Battle – 2005
Mitchell Watt – 2012
Javon McCrea – 2014
Justin Moss – 2015
C. J. Massinburg – 2019

Tournament MVP
Xavier Ford – 2015
Willie Conner – 2016
Wes Clark – 2018
Jeremy Harris – 2019

Coach of the Year
Reggie Witherspoon – 2004
Nate Oats – 2018, 2019

Defensive Player of the Year
Dontay Caruthers – 2017, 2019
Davonta Jordan – 2020
Josh Mballa – 2021

Freshman of the Year
Javon McCrea – 2011

Sixth Man of the Year
Mark Bortz – 2005
Nick Perkins – 2017, 2018, 2019
Ronaldo Segu – 2020

Academic All-MAC

All-MAC teams

All-MAC First Team
Turner Battle – 2005
Rodney Pierce – 2009, 2010
Mitchell Watt – 2012
Javon McCrea – 2012, 2013, 2014
Justin Moss – 2015
C. J. Massinburg – 2018, 2019
Nick Perkins – 2018, 2019
Jayvon Graves – 2020

All-MAC Second Team
Turner Battle – 2004
Calvin Cage – 2006
Byron Mulkey – 2011
Shannon Evans – 2015
Blake Hamilton – 2017
Jeremy Harris – 2018, 2019
Jayvon Graves – 2021
Jeenathan Williams – 2021
Josh Mballa – 2021

All-MAC Third Team
Lamonte Bearden – 2016
Blake Hamilton – 2016
Wes Clark – 2018

All-Freshman Team

All-Defensive Team
Willie Conner – 2016
Dontay Caruthers – 2017, 2019
Davonta Jordan – 2018, 2019
Josh Mballa – 2021

All-Tournament team

See also
 The Basketball Tournament 2022, won by a team primarily rostered with Buffalo Bulls alumni

References

External links